A pork pie is a traditional English meat pie, usually served either at room temperature or cold (although often served hot in Yorkshire). It consists of a filling of roughly chopped pork and pork fat, surrounded by a layer of jellied pork stock in a hot water crust pastry. It is normally eaten as a snack or with a salad.

History

Modern pork pies are a direct descendant of the raised meat pies of medieval cuisine, which used a dense hot water crust pastry as a simple means of preserving the filling. In France the same recipes gave rise to the modern . Many medieval meat pie recipes were sweetened, often with fruit, and were meant to be eaten cold: the crust was discarded rather than being eaten. A particularly elaborate and spectacular recipe described in medieval recipe collection The Forme of Cury was a meat pie featuring a crust formed into battlements and filled with sweet custards, the entire pie then being served flambeed: a distant descendant of this dish, with hollow pastry turrets around a central pork pie, was still current in the 18th century under the name "battalia pie". Hannah Glasse's influential 1747 recipe collection included a recipe for a "Cheshire pork pie", having a filling of layers of pork loin and apple, slightly sweetened with sugar, and filled with half a pint (285ml) of white wine. By the 19th century sweetened fruit and meat combinations had become less common, and the raised crust pork pie took its modern form.

Types

Traditional pies use a mix of fat and cured meat, giving the filling a pink colour. They are often produced in moulds or forms, giving the outside of the pie a very regular shape. This method is simpler and cheaper for volume production, and hence the more common choice for commercial manufacturers.

As the meat shrinks when the pie is cooked, traditional recipes specified that clarified butter or a hot pork stock was poured into the pie after baking. This would set when cool, filling the gap between meat and pastry and preventing air from reaching the filling and causing it to spoil.

Melton Mowbray pork pie

The Melton Mowbray pork pie is named after Melton Mowbray, a town in Leicestershire. While it is sometimes claimed that Melton pies became popular among fox hunters in the area in the late eighteenth century, it has also been stated that the association of the pork pie trade with Melton originated around 1831 as a sideline in a small baker and confectioners' shop in the town, owned by Edward Adcock. Within the next decade a number of other bakers then started supplying them, notably Enoch Evans, a former grocer, who seems to have been particularly responsible for establishing the industry on a large scale. Whether true or not the association with hunting provided valuable publicity, although one local hunting columnist writing in 1872 stated that it was extremely unlikely that "our aristocratic visitors carry lumps of pie with them on horseback".

The main distinctive feature of a Melton pie is that it is made with a hand-formed crust. The uncured meat of a Melton pie is grey in colour when cooked and the meat is chopped, rather than minced. As the pies are baked free-standing, the sides bow outwards, rather than being vertical as with mould-baked pies. Melton Mowbray pork pies are served at room temperature, unlike pork pies in Yorkshire which may be served hot.

In the light of the premium price of the Melton Mowbray pie, the Melton Mowbray Pork Pie Association applied for protection under European protected designation of origin laws as a result of the increasing production of Melton Mowbray-style pies by large commercial companies in factories far from Melton Mowbray, and recipes that deviated from the original uncured pork form. Protection was granted on 4 April 2008, with the result that only pies made within a designated zone around Melton (made within a  zone around the town), and using the traditional recipe including uncured pork, are allowed to carry the Melton Mowbray name on their packaging.

There is a tradition in the East Midlands of eating pork pies for breakfast at Christmas. While its origin is unclear, the association of pork pies with Christmas dates back to at least the mid-19th century and it was by far the busiest time of year for the Melton manufacturers.

Pork pies in Yorkshire 
In Yorkshire, pork pies are often served hot, accompanied with gravy or with mushy peas and mint sauce. It is also a common combination served at Bonfire Night celebrations. In Yorkshire slang a pork pie is sometimes called a "growler", a term probably derived from the "NAAFI growler" of earlier naval and army slang.

An annual pork pie competition is held in April at The Old Bridge Inn, Ripponden, Yorkshire.

Variations

The "gala pie" is a variety of pork pie where the filling includes a proportion of chicken and a hard-boiled egg (also known as a Grosvenor pie). Gala pies are often baked in long, loaf-type tins, with multiple eggs arranged along the centre. 

Smaller, varieties, sometimes branded as a "picnic pie", often have additional ingredients added to the filling such as apples, pickles and bacon.

In some cases the solid pastry top is replaced by a pastry lattice, allowing the meat filling to be seen. A recent development is to have a layer of Branston pickle inserted under the lattice crust. Occasionally the top crust is dispensed with altogether in favour of a layer of cranberries sealed into place with aspic.

See also

 Pork pie hat, so called because of its resemblance to a pork pie
 "Pork pies" (telling "porkies") is Cockney rhyming slang for "lies".
 Rabbit pie
 Tourtière, a Québécois meat pie typically made with pork
 Meat pie
 List of pies, tarts and flans

References

Citations

Sources

External links

 The Melton Mowbray Pork Pie Association, an association of pie makers
 The Pork Pie Appreciation Society
 Photos showing the steps in constructing a rather large pork pie
 Pork pie in What Am I Eating? A Food Dictionary

British pies
British pork dishes
English cuisine
Savoury pies
Victorian cuisine